The 1990–91 Elitserien season was the 16th season of the Elitserien, the top level of ice hockey in Sweden. 12 teams participated in the league, and Djurgårdens IF won the championship.

Standings

First round

Final round

Playoffs

External links
 Swedish Hockey League official site

Swe
1990–91 in Swedish ice hockey
Swedish Hockey League seasons